New Zealand won 6 medals at the 2002 Winter Paralympics: 4 golds, 0 silver and 2 bronze medals.

See also
 New Zealand at the Paralympics

References

External links
 International Paralympic Committee
 Paralympics New Zealand

Nations at the 2002 Winter Paralympics
2002
Paralympics